The Corsican mafia is a set of criminal groups originating from Corsica, which are partially independent of but also closely tied to and participating heavily in both the French underworld and Italian Mafia. The Corsican mafia is an influential organized crime structure operating in France, Russia, and many African and Latin American countries.

History

The Union Corse and the French Connection era

The pre-war crime bosses of Marseille, Paul Carbone and François Spirito, collaborated closely with the Milice in Vichy France and the Nazi Gestapo in Occupied France. Also during World War II, the Corsican gang led by the Guerini brothers (Antoine and Barthélémy, nicknamed "Mémé") sided with the anti-communist Gaullist faction within the French Resistance.

In 1947, Marseille was the main trading port of the French colonial empire and it had a Marxist-Leninist mayor, Jean Christofol, who was backed by the labour unions for longshoremen, transportation workers, and dockworkers. In the coming Cold War, both the center-left French government and the US fought against Soviet influence in Marseille while covertly employing illegal means to further that goal: the Guerini gang was employed to disrupt union and electoral gatherings, back strikebreakers and support US-funded anti-Soviet labor unions.

From the 1950s to the 1960s, the Guerini brother were exempt from prosecution in Marseille. The Guerini brothers smuggled opiates from French Indochina using the Messageries Maritimes, a French merchant shipping company.

From the 1960s to the early 1970s the major Corsican organized crime groups were collectively termed Unione Corse by American law enforcement. During the same era, they organized the French Connection, a massive heroin trafficking operation based in Marseille and selling to the American Mafia.

The Corsican mafia today
The end of the French Connection caused the disbandment of Corsican clans involved in the heroin trade. However, the evolution of the Corsican Mafia has continued in several illegal activities (hold-ups, racketeering, casinos, illegal slot machines, various drug dealing and prostitution).

From the 1980s to the end of the 2000s, violent internal conflicts troubled the Corsican mafia, resulting in around 102 murders on the island of Corsica.

Today, the Corsican mafia consists of multiple families, allies, and rivals. Known groups in the Corsican mafia are the Venzolasca gang (nickname in reference to the village of Venzolasca, in northern Corsica, which are from key members of the gang), considered the Brise de Mer successors. The "Petit Bar" gang (also called the "Tiny Bar) of Ajaccio and the Corsican mob of Marseille are also active.

Corsica has a tradition of banditry and criminality similar to the Italian Mezzogiorno. They are formed by a multitude of criminal groups made up of a few members to a few dozen members. 25 are awarded according to a 2022 report. Their links with political and economic circles are important, as is their hold on the territory with the racket.
The use of violence is frequent, Corsica is the region of Europe with the highest homicide rate per inhabitant.

Known activities of the Corsican mafia
Money laundering
Racketeering
Drug trafficking
Arms trafficking
Prostitution
Extortion
Robbery
Corporate crime
Tax evasion
Contract killing
Casinos and gambling
Political corruption
Usury and loansharking

Popular culture references
 The French film A Prophet (2009) shows the gradual rise of a young prisoner, cornered by the leader of the Corsican gang who rules the prison.
 The French television series Mafiosa references a Corsican gang led by a woman.
 In the film American Gangster, the Corsican mafia attempt to murder Frank Lucas after he puts them out of business through his monopoly on the heroin trade.
 Mireille Bouquet from the anime series Noir (2001) is a surviving member of a family once involved with the Corsican mafia.
 An extensive French study called "Les Parrains Corses" by J. Follorou and V. Nouzille explains the history of the Corsican mafia.
 Ian Fleming's James Bond novel On Her Majesty's Secret Service is set against a background of Union Corse activities.
 In the Japanese manga and anime Banana Fish by Akimi Yoshida, a fictionalized version of the Corsican mafia is heavily featured as the villain. In modern times (1980s for the manga and 2010s for the anime) it is run by an international Corsican Foundation and funded by prostitution, money laundering, tax evasion, government corruption, and the focus of the show is on their drug experimentation.

References

Further reading

"Suspected boss of Corsican mob reported dead" - 1 Nov 2006 USA Today 
"Corsicans prisoners faxed free" - 7 June 2001 BBC Online 
Henry Samuel "Future of Paris gambling clubs under threat" -  Daily Telegraph, 11 June 2011
Kim Willsher On Corsica, the intrigue of crime and politics claims another life  -The Guardian, 20 October 2012.

 
Transnational organized crime
Organised crime groups in Australia
Organized crime groups in France
French Connection